Jessica Woodard (born February 4, 1995) is an American track and field athlete who competes in shot put.

Early life
Raised in the Marlton section of Evesham Township, New Jersey, Woodard attended Cherokee High School in New Jersey. She attended the University of Oklahoma and was an NCAA Outdoor First Team All-American in 2018, as well as Big 12 champion both indoor and outdoor in 2018.

Career
Woodard finished third at the 2022 USA Outdoor Track and Field Championships throwing 19.40m. At the 2022 World Athletics Championships in Eugene, Oregon Woodard was one of three home athletes who reached the final of the women's shot put with a throw of 19.08. Woodard finished in eighth place at the World Championships behind compatriot gold medalist Chase Ealey and ahead of Minnesotan Maggie Ewen in ninth.

References

External links
 

1995 births
Living people
Cherokee High School (New Jersey) alumni
People from Evesham Township, New Jersey
Sportspeople from Burlington County, New Jersey
Track and field athletes from New Jersey
American female shot putters
World Athletics Championships athletes for the United States
20th-century American women
21st-century American women